The red and white giant flying squirrel (Petaurista alborufus) is a species of rodent in the family Sciuridae. Additionally, the red and white giant flying squirrel possibly ranges into northeastern South Asia and far northern Mainland Southeast Asia. This squirrel has a wide range and is relatively common, and the International Union for Conservation of Nature lists it as being of "least concern".

They spend their days sleeping in a tree hollow, emerging at night to forage in the trees. Their diet consists primarily of nuts and fruits, but also includes leafy vegetation, insects and their larvae. This is achieved by the patagium, skin spread out between its limbs.

Taxonomy and distribution
There are several subspecies of the red and white giant flying squirrel. As traditionally defined, the Chinese mainland is inhabited by P. a. alborufus (Gansu, Shaanxi and west Sichuan), P. a. castaneus (Chongqing, Guizhou, Hubei, Hunan, eastern Sichuan, Shaanxi and Yunnan), P. a. leucocephalus (Xizang) and P. a. ochraspis (Guangxi and Yunnan), and Taiwan has P. a. lena. However, records from Gansu, as well as Qinghai, likely are misidentifications of Chinese giant flying squirrels.

The status of the red and white giant flying squirrel in other countries is less clear. One source lists P. a. leucocephalus for northern Myanmar (Burma), and another P. a. ochraspis for northern Myanmar, but the species' presence in this country remains unconfirmed, although it has been confirmed from parts of China that are directly adjacent to northern Myanmar. P. a. leucocephalus has also been listed for Bhutan and Assam, India, but other authorities do not list the species for either country.

The isolated Taiwanese P. a. lena has a distinctive appearance and genetic studies have shown that it is closer to several other giant flying squirrel species than the red and white giant flying squirrel of the Chinese mainland. As a consequence, it has been recommended that it should be recognized as a separate species, the Taiwan giant flying squirrel (P. lena). Another subspecies, candidula of Myanmar and northern Thailand, typically is included in the red giant flying squirrel, but it is possibly better included in the red and white giant flying squirrel.

Appearance
The red and white giant flying squirrel has been called the largest flying squirrel, although a few other species match at least some of its dimensions. Little data is available on the weight of individuals from the Chinese mainland. Although one source specifically lists  for the mainland population, this is based on a study of animals from Taiwan.

In the Chinese mainland, red and white giant flying squirrels have dark rufous-red upperparts with a large buff or straw-coloured patch on the lower back. The throat and head are white, often with a large rufescent patch around each eye, and the underparts are orange-brown. Depending on mainland subspecies, the feet are blackish or reddish, and the distal two-thirds of the tail can be blackish or russet with an orange-brown or whitish ring at its base. The Taiwanese subspecies has a white head with a narrow or no clear eye-ring, all-dark rufous upperparts and tail (no pale patch on lower back or ring on tail), and all-white underparts.

Gliding

Gliding is accomplished with the help of a parachute-like membrane called a patagium. Before taking off, flying squirrels bob and rotate their heads to gauge the route, and then leap into the air, spreading their patagia between cartilaginous spurs on their wrists and ankles. Small adjustments to these spurs give them some control over their speed and direction. Their flattened tails also aid in steering. As their destination nears, they pull upright, prepare their padded feet to cushion the shock of impact, and ready their sharp claws to grip the bark. Gliding is an efficient way to travel but maneuverability in the air is limited. By keeping nocturnal habits, flying squirrels avoid predation by more skilled fliers, such as hawks and eagles. Owls however, still pose a threat.

There are 44 species of flying squirrel worldwide. The fact that most of them live in Asia has led to the hypothesis that they originated there. Only two species are found in the Americas: the Northern flying squirrel lives in deciduous and mixed woods all across Canada as well as down into the Pacific Northwest and Sierra Nevada; the Southern flying squirrel lives in the Eastern half of North America from southern Canada down to Florida, with isolated pockets in Central America.

Gliding has evolved independently in a variety of arboreal animals. Among mammals, there are the marsupial gliding possums of Australia, the colugos of SE Asia, and the scaly-tailed flying squirrels of Africa. Each group glides in a slightly different way, with their patagia being controlled by different morphological adaptations. In some marsupial gliders for example, the patagium attaches at the elbows, whereas in colugos it extends into webbed digits. The fact that all flying squirrels are “wrist gliders” with shared wrist anatomy suggests that they are all descended from a common ancestor, presumably some sort of primitive tree squirrel. Non-mammalian arboreal gliders include frogs, geckos, snakes, lizards, and even ants.

Status
This species has a wide distribution and a presumed large population, it occurs in many protected areas, and the International Union for Conservation of Nature has rated it as being of "least concern".

References

Petaurista
Rodents of China
Mammals of Taiwan
Mammals described in 1870
Taxonomy articles created by Polbot